Goodenia fordiana is a species of flowering plant in the family Goodeniaceae and is endemic to north-eastern New South Wales. It is a prostrate herb with a rosette of leaves and yellow flowers near the end of leafy stalks.

Description
Flowering occurs from October to December.

Taxonomy and naming
Goodenia fordiana was first formally described in 1990 by Roger Charles Carolin in the journal Telopea from material collected in 1913 near Coramba. The specific epithet (fordiana) honours Neridah Ford who drew Carolin's attention to the species.

Distribution and habitat
This goodenia grows in forest and woodland on the lower ranges of New South Wales between the Coffs Harbour area and Bulahdelah.

References

fordiana
Flora of New South Wales
Plants described in 1990
Taxa named by Roger Charles Carolin
Endemic flora of Australia